Lee is a given name derived from the English surname Lee (which is ultimately from a placename derived from Old English leah "clearing; meadow").

According to the Social Security Administration's popular baby name database, its popularity peaked in the United States in 1900 at rank 39 as a masculine name, and in 1955 at rank 182 as a feminine name. The name's popularity declined steadily in the second half of the 20th century, falling below rank 1000 by 1991 as a feminine name, and to 698 as of 2021 as a masculine name.
In the later 20th century, it also gained some popularity in the United Kingdom, peaking among the 20 most popular boys' names during the 1970s to 1980s, but it had fallen out of the top 100 by 2001.

Lee is also a hypocoristic form of the given names Ashley, Beverly, Kimberley, Leona, and Leslie (all of which are also derived from English placenames containing -leah as a second element; with the possible exception of Leslie, which may be an anglicization of a Gaelic placename).

People

A–G
 Lee Allen (musician) (1927–1994), American tenor saxophonist
 Lee Andrews (1936–2016), American singer, leader of the doo-wop group Lee Andrews & the Hearts
 Lee Bowyer, English footballer
 Lee Boyd Malvo, Jamaican serial killer, perpetrator of the Beltway sniper attacks
 Lee Boylan, English footballer
 Lee Brewster (1943-2000), American drag queen, transgender activist, and retailer
 Lee C. White, advisor to President Kennedy and Johnson
 Lee Camp (footballer), Northern Irish footballer
 Lee Cattermole, English footballer
 Lee Clark (footballer), English footballer and manager
 Lee Croft, English footballer
 Lee DeWyze, American singer and the winner of Season 9 of American Idol
 Lee Dickson, English rugby player
 Lee Dixon, English footballer
 Lee Dorrian, singer, Napalm Death, Cathedral
 Lee Evans, English comedian and actor
 Lee Feldman (businessman) (born 1967/68), American lawyer and businessman
 Lee Fierro (1929–2020), American actress
 Lee Gaze, guitarist for Lostprophets
 Lee Germon, New Zealand cricket player
 Lee Gibson (born 1991), Scottish footballer
 Lee Grant (born October 31, mid-1920s), American actress and director
 Lee Grant (disambiguation)
 Lee Greenwood, American country music singer known for the song "God Bless the USA"
 Lee Grosscup (1936–2020), American football player and sportscaster
 Elbert Lee Guillory, Louisiana African-American Republican

H–M
 Lee Hall (artist) (1934–2017), American abstract expressionist painter, educator, writer, university president
 Lee Harding, Australian singer
 Lee Harvey Oswald, assassin of John F. Kennedy
 Lee Hendrie, English footballer
 Lee Hughes, English footballer
 Lee Iacocca, chairman of Chrysler Corporation
 Lee J. Ames (1921–2011), American artist
 Lee J. Cobb, American actor
 Lee James, American Olimpic weightlifter
 Lee Johnson (footballer), English footballer
 Lee Kerslake (1947–2020), English musician
 Lee Kiefer, American Fencer, 2021 Olympic Gold Medalist
 Lee Konitz, American jazz alto saxophonist
 Lee Korzits, Israeli world champion windsurfer
 Lee Krasner (1908–1984), American abstract expressionist painter
 Lee Lorenz (1932-2022), American cartoonist
 Lee Mack, English comedian and actor
 Lee Majors, American actor
 Lee Marshall, American announcer
 Lee Martin (disambiguation)
 Lee Marvin, American actor
 Lee Matthews (footballer) (born 1979), English football striker
 Lee Matthews (singer) (born 1988), Irish pop singer formerly known as Lee Mulhern, also known as Lee.M
 Lee Mavers, English musician
 Lee McConnell, Scottish track and field athlete
 Lee McCulloch, Scottish footballer
 Lee McKenzie, Scottish journalist and presenter
 Lee Meriwether, American actress 
 Lee Miller (1907–1977), American fashion model, photographer, war photojournalist
 Lee Minto (born 1927), American women's health advocate and sex education activist
 Lee Morgan, an American hard bop trumpeter
 Lee Mossop, English rugby player

N–Z
 Lee Nailon, American NBA basketball player and 2007 Israeli Basketball Premier League MVP
 Lee Naylor (disambiguation)
 Lee Newton, American actress and comedian
 Lee Nguyen, American soccer player
 Lee Nicholls, English footballer
 Lee Norris, American actor
 Lee Novak, English footballer
 Lee O'Connor (disambiguation)
 Lee Ocran, Ghanaian politician
 Lee Olesky, American business executive
 Lee Oser, American novelist and literary critic
 Lee Oskar, Danish harmonica player
 Lee Pace, American actor
 Lee Peltier, English footballer
 Lee "Scratch" Perry, Jamaican musician
 Lee Probert, English football referee
 Lee Quiñones (born 1960 as George Quiñones), American graffiti artist
 Lee Ranaldo, guitarist (and occasional vocalist) for Sonic Youth
 Lee Remick, American actress
 Lee Richard, American baseball player
 Lee Greene Richards, American painter
 Lee Rigby, British soldier murdered by Islamists in Woolwich, London
 Lee Riley, American football player
 Lee Ritenour, American jazz guitarist
 Lee Roberts, American actor
 Lee Roberts (basketball), American basketball player
 Lee Robertson, Scottish footballer
 Lee Robinson (disambiguation)
 Lee Rogers (disambiguation)
 Lee Ryan, English singer
 Lee Sampson, Canadian football player
 Lee Sandales, set decorator 
 Lee Sharpe, English footballer
 Lee Smith (disambiguation)
 Lee Stensness, New Zealand rugby player 
 Lee Stevens, American baseball player
 Lee Strobel, Christian apologist
 Lee Tamahori, New Zealand director
 Lee Tergesen, American actor
 Lee Trevino, American golfer
 Chrystelle Lee Trump Bond (1938–2020), American dancer, choreographer, and dance historian
 Lee Trundle, English footballer
 Lee Unkrich, American director, editor, screenwriter and animator
 Lee Van Cleef, American actor
 Lee Ving, guitarist and singer of the American hardcore punk band Fear
 Lee Wai Leng (born 1969), Malaysian badminton player
 Lee Westwood, English golfer
 Lee Wiley, American jazz singer from the big band era
 Lee Williamson, Jamaican footballer
 Lee Williamson (American football), American football player
 Lee Zeldin (born 1980), Republican United States Congressman, former New York state senator

People called Leee
Some people spell their name with three Es instead of two:
 Leee Black Childers (born Lee Black Childers; 1945–2014), American avant-garde photographer and music manager
 Leee John (born John Leslie McGregor; 1957), British pop musician

Fictional characters
 Lee, a character in 1993 action/martial arts film Showdown
 Lee, a character in the 1997 American comedy film Fathers' Day
 Lee, played by Lee Mack in his sitcom Not Going Out
 Lee, a character played by actor JR Reed in association with the comedy rock band Tenacious D
 Lee Adama, fictional character in the television series Battlestar Galactica
 Lee Brackett, a character in the horror film Halloween
 L For Leeeeee x, a bear played by Scottish YouTuber Lee Carson on stampylonghead's channel until 2015
 Lee Chaolan, character in the Tekken series
 Lee Everett, the protagonist in the 2012 video game The Walking Dead
 Lee Harris, a character in the television series American Horror Story: Roanoke
 Lee Jordan, a character in the Harry Potter series
 Lee Kanker, oldest of the Kanker sisters on Ed, Edd n Eddy
 Lee McDermott, a character in Desperate Housewives
 Lee Montgomery, a character in the Quentin Tarantino film Death Proof
 Lee Ping, the protagonist of the television series Detentionaire
 Lee Scoresby, a character in Philip Pullman's His Dark Materials trilogy
 Lee Sin, the Blind Monk, a playable champion character in the action real-time strategy video game League of Legends

References

See also
List of people with surname Lee
 Lee (Korean surname)
 Leigh (disambiguation)
 Lea (disambiguation)
 Leah (name)
 Leeland (given name)

English masculine given names
English feminine given names
English unisex given names
English-language unisex given names